Sabrina Rachel Cohen-Hatton (born 1983) is a British firefighter, psychologist and writer. She is the Chief Fire Officer of the West Sussex Fire and Rescue Service. In 2019 she was selected as one of Marie Claire's Future Shapers and featured on Desert Island Discs.

Early life and education 
Cohen-Hatton was born and raised in Marshfield, Newport, South Wales. She attended Bassaleg School. Her mother was of Jewish heritage and her father was born in Israel to Moroccan-Jewish parents, but the family did not mix with the Jewish community in Wales or attend synagogue. However, her father is buried in a local Jewish cemetery. At the age of 15, Cohen-Hatton was made homeless after her father died of a brain tumour. Her school was aware that she was not living at home, but did nothing to support her. They also insisted that she wore a wig to cover her dyed hair during her GCSE examinations. During her homelessness, she sold The Big Issue and slept on the streets of Newport, Wales.

At the end of her school career, she slept in a derelict building. During the time she spent on the streets, Cohen-Hatton suffered from antisemitic attacks. For around two years, she either slept rough or was vulnerably housed. It took her several attempts to get off the streets and into secure accommodation, including a spending some time sleeping in a van. She joined the fire service in South Wales in 2001 at the age of eighteen. She was the first woman firefighter at that station. Whilst serving as a firefighter, she completed a bachelor's degree in psychology at the Open University, eventually completing a PhD in the behavioural neuroscience lab at Cardiff University in 2013. She has since become an ambassador of The Big Issue and has said that it saved her life.

Career 
Cohen-Hatton's husband is also a firefighter. In an interview, she recalled a moment where she had responded to a fire and found a horrifically injured firefighter who she thought was her husband. It was not, and she credits that experience to promoting her interest in reducing human error and making firefighters safer. This was also the driver for her to study psychology. Following her PhD, she began to lead research on behalf of the National Fire Chiefs Council (then CFOA). Her research project fitted helmet cameras to incident commanders as they went out on incidents. Her research identified that 80% of the decisions made by firefighters were due to gut instinct, with the other 20% due to an analytical approach. 

Cohen-Hatton's research resulted in a new decision control process that helps commanders consider goals, consequences and risks that they take under pressure. She found that if firefighters took part in goal-oriented training the number of commanders operating at the most significant level of situation awareness increased up to five times.

As part of her research, Cohen-Hatton investigated different training interventions, including virtual reality, firehouse training and live burn. She completed her PhD. Her work helped to shape national fire service policy and informed the National Fire Chiefs Council. She co-supervises a research group at Cardiff University with Rob Honey, supported by the National Fire Chiefs Council, that considers decision making in the emergency service environment.

Only 3.1% firefighters in Britain are women, and Cohen-Hatton has worked to inspire girls to become firefighters. She served as Assistant Commissioner seconded to Her Majesty's Inspectorate of Constabulary and Fire & Rescue Services and as a Deputy Assistant Commissioner for the London Fire Brigade. Her first book, The Heat of the Moment, was published by Penguin Books in 2019. She was appointed Chief Fire Officer of the West Sussex Fire and Rescue Service in 2019.

Awards and honours 
2013 Cardiff University Jury Research Prize
2014 FIRE/GORE Research Excellence prize
2016 American Psychological Association Early Career Award from the Society for Experimental Psychology and Cognitive Science
 2017 People's Choice Award at the Cardiff University Innovation and Impact Awards
 2018 Biotechnology and Biological Sciences Research Council (BBSRC) Innovator of the Year award
 2018 American Psychological Association Raymond Nickerson Best Paper Award
 2018 Honorary Fellowship at Cardiff University
2018 Cosmopolitan Millennial Power List 
 2019 Marie Claire Future Shaper
2020 The Big Issue Top 100 Changemakers list, Top Campaigner
2020 Jewish Care Woman of Distinction 
2021 Honorary Doctor of Science Award at Royal Holloway University
2022 Honorary degree of Doctor of the University, conferred by the Open University in Wales

Personal life 
Cohen-Hatton is married to firefighter Mike Hatton and they have a daughter. She keeps Xolo dogs.

References 

1983 births
Alumni of Cardiff University
Alumni of the Open University
Welsh people of Jewish descent
British firefighters
Living people
Women in firefighting
People from Newport, Wales
British people of Moroccan-Jewish descent
British Sephardi Jews
Welsh people of Israeli descent
People educated at Bassaleg School
Welsh people of Moroccan-Jewish descent